Hweiling Ow is a New Zealand film and television producer, director and actor. In 2020 she won the Woman to Watch Award at the Women in Film and Television New Zealand Awards.

Biography 
Hweiling Ow was born in Malaysia and moved to New Zealand when she was young. She started acting in her 20s and has appeared on the New Zealand television soap opera Shortland Street and Mean Mums. She has been a producer and director on AFK — a web series set inside an online roleplaying game — and Ao-Terror-Oa.

References

Malaysian emigrants to New Zealand
21st-century New Zealand actresses
New Zealand television producers
New Zealand television directors
People from Petaling Jaya
Year of birth missing (living people)
Living people